Wendy Beetlestone (born April 4, 1961) is  a United States district judge of the United States District Court for the Eastern District of Pennsylvania.

Biography

Beetlestone attended Rishworth School in Yorkshire, before graduating with a Bachelor of Arts degree, cum laude, in 1984 from the University of Liverpool. She received a Juris Doctor in 1993 from the University of Pennsylvania Law School. She began her legal career as a law clerk for Judge Robert S. Gawthrop III, of the United States District Court for the Eastern District of Pennsylvania, from 1993 to 1994. From 1994 to 2002, she worked at the law firm of Schnader, Harrison, Segal & Lewis LLP, becoming a partner in 2001. From 2002 to 2005, she served as General Counsel of the School District of Philadelphia. From 2005 to 2014, she had been a shareholder at the law firm of Hangley, Aronchick, Segal, Pudlin & Schiller, where she litigated a variety of commercial matters before both Federal and State courts. In 2023, she was announced as the next Chancellor of the University of Liverpool. She is the University’s eleventh Chancellor and the institution’s first female, and first Black, Chancellor.

Federal judicial service

On June 16, 2014, President Barack Obama nominated Beetlestone to serve as a United States District Judge of the United States District Court for the Eastern District of Pennsylvania, to the seat vacated by Judge Michael Baylson, who assumed senior status on July 13, 2012. On July 24, 2014, a hearing before the United States Senate Committee on the Judiciary was held on her nomination. On September 18, 2014, her nomination was reported out of committee by a voice vote. On November 18, 2014, Senate Majority Leader Harry Reid filed for cloture on her nomination. On Wednesday November 19, 2014, cloture was invoked by a 58–38 vote. On Thursday, November 20, 2014, the Senate confirmed her nomination by a voice vote. She received her judicial commission on November 21, 2014.

Among other notable cases in which she has presided, on December 15, 2017, Beetlestone issued a nationwide injunction prohibiting the enforcement of regulations that allowed employers to refuse to cover contraception in their employees’ insurance plans if they have either religious objections to birth control or “sincerely held moral convictions” against it.  “It is difficult,” Judge Beetlestone wrote, “to comprehend a rule that does more to undermine the contraceptive mandate or that intrudes more into the lives of women.”  Judge Beetlestone issued a second nationwide injunction after President Trump issued revised rules.

See also 
 List of African-American federal judges
 List of African-American jurists

References

External links

1961 births
Living people
African-American judges
Alumni of the University of Liverpool
American women lawyers
American lawyers
Chancellors of the University of Liverpool
Judges of the United States District Court for the Eastern District of Pennsylvania
Pennsylvania lawyers
United States district court judges appointed by Barack Obama
21st-century American judges
University of Pennsylvania Law School alumni
21st-century American women judges